The Ultimate Bowl was the annual championship game of the Ultimate Indoor Football League (UIFL). In 2011, it was the meeting of the two semifinal game winners. In 2012, it was the meeting of the winners of the North and South Divisions.

Past Ultimate Bowls

Number of appearances:
Saginaw Sting: 1 1-0
Eastern Kentucky Drillers: 1 0-1
Cincinnati Commandos: 1 1-0
Florida Tarpons: 3 1-2
Corpus Christi Fury: 2 1-1

Box scores

Ultimate Bowl I: Eastern Kentucky Drillers vs. Saginaw Sting

References

External links
Ultimate Bowl I stats (2011)

Ultimate Indoor Football League
Indoor American football competitions